State Highway 60 (SH-60) is a state highway in Benewah County, Idaho, United States. It connects Washington State Route 274 at the Washington state line to U.S. Route 95 (US-95).

Route description

SH-60 begins at the Washington state line as a continuation of Washington State Route 274, which travels west to Tekoa. The highway crosses Little Hangman Creek and travels southeast along Moctileme Creek; it continues east along the creek to a junction with US-95. SH-60 ends at the junction with US-95, which serves as the main north–south highway in the Idaho Panhandle region. The entire highway lies within the Coeur d'Alene Reservation in Benewah County.

History

SH-60 was added to the state highway system on September 17, 1959, by the Idaho Board of Highway Directors.

Major intersections

See also

 List of state highways in Idaho

References

External links

060
Transportation in Benewah County, Idaho